The SOMUA MCG was a half-track artillery tractor and recovery vehicle of the French forces during World War II.

Manufactured by the Somua company it was used to tow medium artillery pieces such as the 155 mm mle 1917 howitzer and the 105 mm mle 1936 field gun, as well as their specific ammunition trailers. Of this main version 345 were produced: 264 until 1 September 1939 and another 81 until the end of May 1940.

There was also a recovery version, fitted with a crane, to recover broken-down tanks, of which about 440 were produced.

Foreign use
After France's surrender, many SOMUA MCG and SOMUA MCL half-tracks were captured by the Germans and put to use in the German Army. Some were used as artillery tractors. Most were converted by Major Alfred Becker's workshop (Baustokommando Becker) into armoured half-tracks. These were used to fill a variety of roles in the 21st Panzer Division, when it was reformed after its destruction in North Africa campaign. Variants of these included an armoured rocket launcher with an 8 cm Raketen-Vielfachwerfer, a self-propelled mortar mounting an 8 cm Reihenwerfer multiple mortar array and a tank destroyer version with a 7.5 cm Pak 40 anti-tank gun.

Greece acquired 48 Somua MCG half-tracks and used them to tow 85 mm guns and 155 mm howitzers. An unknown quantity also went to Turkey.

Gallery

See also
Adolphe Kégresse
Kegresse track
Unditching roller

References

Bibliography
 Vauvillier, F. & Touraine, J.-M. L'automobile sous l'uniforme 1939-40, Massin, 1992, 

Artillery tractors
World War II vehicles of France
World War II half-tracks
Half-tracks of France
Military vehicles introduced in the 1930s